The Northfield News is a weekly newspaper in the U.S. state of Vermont. It was started in 1878 by George Richmond and is owned by Northfield News Publishing, LLC. The Northfield News is published weekly on Thursdays and serves Northfield and surrounding communities in Washington County, Vermont. According to the American Newspapers Representative database, the Northfield News has a weekly paid circulation of 1,500 copies.

History 
Northfield News was founded in 1878 by George Richmond. Richmond sold the paper to Fred Norris Whitney in 1884.

Fred Norris Whitney was the publisher of Northfield News from 1884 to 1888 and again from 1904-1908. Between 1888 and 1904, the paper was owned by E. Gerry & Co. of Randolph and run by Luther B. Johnson. Johnson sold the paper back to Whitney in 1904 and bought the Burlington Clipper. Whitney managed paper and the Northfield Publishing Company from 1904 to 1912, when he died. Mrs. Whitney continued to own and run the paper until 1916, when she sold the paper to Frank T. Parsons. 

The Northfield News editor, John Mazuzan, bought the paper in 1932 in a sheriff’s sale from the Northfield Trust Company.  Mazuzan and co-owner James G. Gilbert changed the named of the paper to News and Advertiser. 

Francis Edward Flood owned and operated the paper with his brother from 1973-1979. He continued to write and edit historical articles for the paper until the Wednesday before he died, in 1986. Francis and his brother Bernie sold the paper to Bob and Debbie Pinto in 1979. At the time, the paper was still being set by hand and printed on a press bought in 1926. The Pintos sold the paper to James and Ingrid Wilson who, in 1984, purchased a new off-set printer.

The paper was nearly shut down in 2003 until a last-minute buyer Cecelia Barnes bought the paper. The previous owners James and Ingrid Wilson announced that they would shut down the paper after running it for 20 years.

References 

Newspapers published in Vermont